Golden Screen Cinemas Sdn Bhd (GSC) is Malaysia's largest cinema exhibitor and a wholly-owned subsidiary of PPB Group Berhad (a member of the Kuok Group), which is an exhibitor and distributor of movies and content in Malaysia. It operates over 600 screens in 70 locations across Malaysia and Vietnam, with 504 screens in 55 locations in Malaysia, and 108 screens in 18 locations in Vietnam through a partnership with Galaxy Studio.

History 
Golden Screen was founded in 1987 under the name of Golden Communications Circuit, a joint venture between Hong Kong's Golden Harvest and the Malaysian conglomerate PPB Group, the latter of whom operated a small set of Malaysian cinemas leased from Shaw Brothers Studio. After January 1988 merger between Golden Communications (GC) Circuit and the Malaysian branch of Cathay Organisation, the company was renamed Golden Screen Cinemas.

Locations

GSC is present in all states and territories of Malaysia except in Labuan and Kelantan, the latter of which has banned cinema within the state since 1990.

Johor

Kedah

Kuala Lumpur

Malacca

Negeri Sembilan

Pahang

Penang

Perak

Putrajaya

Sabah

Sarawak

Selangor

Terengganu

See also 
 Lotus Five Star 
 TGV Cinemas
 MBO Cinemas
 List of cinemas in Malaysia

References

Cinema chains in Malaysia
Entertainment companies established in 1987
Privately held companies of Malaysia
1987 establishments in Malaysia
Film distributors of Malaysia